The St. Louis-class cruisers were a class of three cruisers that served in the United States Navy at the beginning of the 20th century. Authorized in fiscal year 1901 by an Act of Congress of 7 June 1900 as part of the naval buildup touched off by the Spanish–American War, the St. Louis-class cruiser initially began as an improved . This led to a larger power plant, and other decisions were made to try to increase speed and range, such as using smaller  guns instead of  guns, and adding coal capacity. The completed ship at 9,700 long tons was the same displacement as a full armored cruiser (such as the Royal Navy's , launched four years prior to the St. Louis class) without the same armor. One reference describes the class as "among the earliest well-documented examples of creeping growth in warship design".

Milwaukee grounded near Eureka, California, and was lost in January 1917. The other ships of the class patrolled for German commerce raiders and escorted convoys in World War I, were decommissioned in the early 1920s, and were sold for scrap in 1930 in compliance with the London Naval Treaty.

Ship type
Because of their relatively thin belt, this class was officially described as "semi-armored cruisers", bridging the gap between protected cruisers and armored cruisers. The Register of Ships of the US Navy lists them with the protected cruisers. However, some other references list them as armored cruisers. They were originally designated "cruisers" and not "armored cruisers", in the same series as protected cruisers.

Design and construction

Armament
The armament of these ships was very similar to that of the concurrently-built  armored cruisers, minus the 8-inch turreted guns and the torpedo tubes. The main armament was fourteen 6-in/50 caliber Mark 6 guns (Mark 8 in Milwaukee), mounted one each fore and aft with the remainder in casemates on the sides. The large secondary armament, intended to combat torpedo boats, included eighteen /50 caliber rapid fire (RF) guns and twelve 3-pounder RF guns. Four 1-pounder automatic guns, eight 1-pounder (37-mm) RF guns, and two .30 cal. (7.62 mm) machine guns (possibly the M1895 Colt–Browning machine gun) were also carried.

Armor

The armor of these ships was similar in arrangement to an armored cruiser, although significantly lighter compared to the concurrently-built . Harvey armor was used. A  waterline belt that covered only the machinery spaces was augmented by a 4 in upper belt protecting the casemated guns.

Engineering

The normal coal allowance was 650 tons, but this could be increased to 1,650 tons.

Refits

By 1911 the 1-pounder guns and machine guns had been removed, and the 3-pounder armament reduced to four saluting guns. During World War I two of the 6-inch guns and all but four of the 3-inch single-purpose guns were removed, while two 3-in/50 caliber anti-aircraft guns were added.

Ships in class

The three ships of the St. Louis class were:

On 17 July 1920 St. Louis and Charleston were reclassified with the new hull numbers CA-18 (armored cruiser) and CA-19, respectively.

See also
 List of cruisers of the United States Navy

References

Bibliography

External links
Cruiser photo gallery index at NavSource Naval History
Global Security.org - St. Louis class cruiser
Global Security.org - St. Louis class cruiser specifications

Cruiser classes